Kalaipuli S. Thanu is an Indian film producer, director and distributor, known for his films in Tamil cinema. He has produced several films through his two companies, V Creations and Kalaipuli Films International. Many of his films have been commercially successful, three of which are among the top-ten highest grossing Tamil films. He has won two National Film Awards, two Cinema Express Awards and one Filmfare Awards South.

Personal life
Thanu is married to Kala. Their son Kalaprabhu made his directorial debut with Sakkarakatti (2008). Thanu also has a daughter Kavitha.

Career
S. Thanu began his career as a film financier and distributor, before becoming a producer and a partner at Kalaipuli Films with S. Thanu and Soori with Yaar? (1985), being their debut film as producers. He initially started as a publicity designer being responsible for christening Rajinikanth as "Superstar" and creating a 35 feet cutout of him in a theatre. He started his own company V. Creations and went on to produce commercially successful films with Vijayakanth in Cooliekkaran (1987), Nallavan (1988) and  Pudhu Padagan (1990). His Vanna Vanna Pookkal (1992) directed by Balu Mahendra won the National Film Award for Best Feature Film in Tamil. He also did in a cameo appearance for a film Magalir Mattum in 1994. Kizhakku Cheemayile (1993) and Kandukondain Kandukondain (2000) won the Cinema Express Award for Best Film – Tamil. He has also produced films with Suriya in Kaakha Kaakha (2003), Maayavi (2005) and with Vijay in Sachein (2005), Thuppakki (2012) and Theri (2016).   He collaborated with Rajinikanth for the first time for Kabali (2016).

He has produced four films for Dhanush such as Velaiilla Pattadhari 2 (2017), Asuran (2019), Karnan (2021) and Naane Varuvean (2022).

Companies 

Thanu owns Kalaipuli Films and V Creations. The former company was registered as a private company on 8 March 2004, and the CEO of the latter is Thanu's other son Paranthaman.

Filmography

As actor

As producer

As distributor 
 2022 - Iravin Nizhal
 2022 - Andhagan
 2021 - Maraikayar: Arabikadalin Singam (Tamil version)
 2019 - Kurukshetra (Tamil dubbed)
 2019 - Lucifer (Tamil dubbed)
 2017 - Velaiilla Pattadhari 2 
 2016 - Parandhu Sella Vaa
 2016 - Meendum Oru Kadhal Kadhai
 2015 - Vellaiya Irukiravan Poi Solla Maatan
 2015 - Thakka Thakka
 2014 - Yennamo Yedho
 2014 - Ner Ethir
 2012 - Urumi
 2011 - Maaveeran
 2011 - Pathinaaru
 2010 - Thottupaar
 2010 - Milaga
 1996 - Siraichaalai (Tamil dubbed)
1996 - Delhi Diary (Tamil dubbed)

Awards and honours 

National Film Awards
 Won, Best Feature Film in Tamil for Vanna Vanna Pookkal (1992)
 Won, Best Feature Film in Tamil for Asuran (2019)

Cinema Express Awards
 Won, Best Film for Kizhakku Cheemayile (1993) 
 Won, Best Film for  Kandukondain Kandukondain (2000)

Filmfare Awards South
 Won, Best Film for Kandukondain Kandukondain (2000) 
 Nominated, Best Film for  Kaakha Kaakha (2003)
 Nominated, Best Film for Thuppakki (2012)  
 Nominated, Best Film for Theri (2016)
 Nominated, Best Film for Kabali (2016)
 Nominated, Best Film for Karnan  (2021)

South Indian International Movie Awards
 Nominated, Best Film for Thuppakki (2012)
 Nominated, Best Film for Theri (2016)
 Nominated, Best Film for Asuran (2019)
 Nominated, Best Film for Karnan  (2021)

Vijay Awards
 Won, Favourite Film for Thuppakki (2012)

Edison Awards
 Won, Best Film for Kabali (2016)

Ananda Vikatan Cinema Awards
 Won, Most Popular Movie for Kabali (2016)

IIFA Utsavam
Nominated, Best Film for Kabali (2016)

Norway Tamil Film Festival Awards
 Won, Best Film for Asuran (2019)

References

External links 
 
 

Living people
Tamil film producers
Indian film distributors
1958 births